Jonathan Bernier (born August 7, 1988) is a Canadian professional ice hockey goaltender for the New Jersey Devils of the National Hockey League (NHL). He was drafted in the first round, 11th overall, of the 2006 NHL Entry Draft by the Los Angeles Kings, the team with whom he played his first four NHL seasons. Bernier won the Stanley Cup with the Kings in 2012.

Playing career
As a youth, Bernier played in the 2001 Quebec International Pee-Wee Hockey Tournament with a minor ice hockey team from Laval, Quebec.

Junior
Bernier's junior career was spent entirely with the Lewiston Maineiacs in the Quebec Major Junior Hockey League (QMJHL). The first goal scored on him in the QMJHL was by his brother, Marc-André Bernier, at the Halifax Metro Centre on September 24, 2004. The goal was in the first period at 15:39. It was Jonathan's first ever QMJHL game. During the 2006–07 season, Bernier won the President's Cup with the Maineiacs as champions of the QMJHL.

Professional

Los Angeles Kings
On September 29, 2007, Bernier was given the starting role for the Kings in their 2007–08 debut game versus the Anaheim Ducks in London, UK. He allowed one goal on 27 shots, earning the first win of his career by the final score of 4–1, while being named the second star of the game. In the four games he played during the 2007–08 season, Bernier finished with a  record, a 4.03 goals against average (GAA) and a .864 save percentage. Bernier was then sent back to his junior team in Lewiston.

Due to the emergence of Jonathan Quick, the Kings sent Bernier to play for their American Hockey League (AHL) affiliate, the Manchester Monarchs, for the 2008–09 and 2009–10 seasons. He was selected for the 2010 AHL All-Star Game, for Team Canada.

Bernier was recalled to the Kings in 2010, while Quick was attending the birth of his first child. Bernier's first NHL game that season was a 29-save, 2–1 shootout win against the Dallas Stars, during which he stopped all six shots he faced in the shootout. In his next game on March 30, he recorded a 2–0 shutout against the Nashville Predators.

Bernier was part of the Kings squad that won the 2012 Stanley Cup Final against the New Jersey Devils. He was an unused backup, who was dressed on the bench but did not play in any of that year's playoffs. Nevertheless, Bernier's name was engraved on the Stanley Cup.

Bernier recorded his first shutout of the 2012–13 season on April 4, 2013 against the Minnesota Wild in a 23-save, 3–0 victory.

Toronto Maple Leafs
On June 23, 2013, Bernier was traded to the Toronto Maple Leafs in exchange for forward Matt Frattin, goaltender Ben Scrivens and a second-round draft pick in either 2014 or 2015.

In a pre-season game on September 22, 2013, Bernier engaged in a fight with Buffalo Sabres goaltender Ryan Miller. The Leafs went on to win the game 5–3. It was Bernier's first fight in a professional game.

The early part of the 2013–14 season saw Bernier and James Reimer split playing time; however, as the season progressed, Bernier cemented himself as the starting goaltender. On March 14, in his first return to Los Angeles, Bernier played one period before leaving with a lower body injury. He missed five games due to this injury, during which the Maple Leafs went . On April 3, Bernier suffered another lower body injury that caused him to miss the rest of the season.

Anaheim Ducks
With one year remaining on his contract, Bernier was traded by the Maple Leafs to the Anaheim Ducks in exchange for a conditional pick in the 2017 NHL Entry Draft on July 8, 2016 (the conditions were not met). Reunited with Ducks head coach Randy Carlyle, who had been Bernier's coach in the early part of his time with the Maple Leafs, he assumed the backup goaltender duties behind John Gibson for the 2016–17 season. Bernier made his Ducks debut in a 3-2 defeat to the reigning champions, the Pittsburgh Penguins, on October 15, 2016. He collected his first win with the Ducks in a 4-1 result over the Calgary Flames on November 6, 2016.

Bernier deputised as the starting goaltender in the final stages of the regular season, when Gibson was injured. He continued as the starter into the playoffs. Bernier then went 13 straight games without a regulation loss. He finished the regular season having played in 39 games, winning 21 of them. Gibson returned to the starter role in time for the playoffs. Bernier made his first playoff appearance for the Ducks in the third game against the Calgary Flames, when he replaced Gibson mid-game in 5-4 comeback victory. His next appearance was in the conference finals, when Gibson was injured in 3-1 defeat to the Nashville Predators on May 20, 2017. Bernier made his first career playoff start in the following Game 6, but allowed 4 goals in 16 shots as the Ducks were eliminated on May 22, 2017.

Colorado Avalanche
Bernier's contract with the Ducks expired on 1 July 2017, leaving him an unrestricted free agent. The same day, he signed a one-year, $2.75 million contract with the Colorado Avalanche. However, his 2017–18 season with the Avalanche was riddled with injuries. Bernier suffered an upper body injury on October 25, 2017, in a game against the San Jose Sharks, and a head injury on February 16, 2018 which caused him to miss 10 games. Shortly after returning, he suffered a second head injury on March 10, 2018, in a game against the Arizona Coyotes, and in late March an infection kept him out for three games. The Avalanche made the 2018 Stanley Cup playoffs, where Bernier started Game 1 against the Nashville Predators due to an injury to first-choice goaltender Semyon Varlamov. Bernier was himself injured in Game 4 and was replaced by Andrew Hammond in the third period. Hammond started the following two games as the Avalanche were eliminated in six games.

Detroit Red Wings
With his contract again expiring in the summer, Bernier left the Avalanche as a free agent. He agreed to a three-year, $9 million contract with the Detroit Red Wings on July 1, 2018. In Detroit, he became the backup to starting goaltender Jimmy Howard. On November 8, 2019, in a game against the Boston Bruins, Bernier recorded two assists, becoming the first Red Wings goalie to do so since Jim Rutherford in 1979.

New Jersey Devils
On July 22, 2021, as a pending unrestricted free agent, Bernier was traded by the Red Wings after three seasons with the team to the Carolina Hurricanes, along with a third-round pick, in exchange for Alex Nedeljkovic. Unable to agree to terms with the Hurricanes, on July 28, 2021, Bernier signed as a free agent a two-year, $8.25 million contract with the New Jersey Devils.

International play

Bernier represented Team Canada's under-18 team at the 2006 IIHF World U18 Championships in April, which was held in Sweden. Canada finished fourth at the tournament.

Bernier was invited to the 2007 World Junior Ice Hockey Championships selection camp, but lost out to Montreal Canadiens' prospect Carey Price and Calgary Flames' prospect Leland Irving.

Along with Steve Mason, Bernier was chosen as one of Team Canada's goaltenders for the 2008 World Junior Ice Hockey Championships, held in the Czech Republic, in which he finished with a 1–1 record and a 2.00 GAA as Canada won the gold medal over Sweden.

During the 2012–13 NHL lock-out, Bernier represented Team Canada at the 2012 Spengler Cup, winning a gold medal in the final over Swiss club HC Davos.

Personal life
Bernier married Martine Forget, a Canadian model, on July 23, 2016. They have two sons, Tyler (born August 2014) and Brady (born April 2019), and a daughter, Ivy (born December 2020). Bernier was a groomsman at the wedding of Meghan Agosta and Marco Marciano, the goaltending coach of the Blainville-Boisbriand Armada of the QMJHL on August 31, 2012.

Bernier's older brother, Marc-André Bernier, was selected in the second round of the 2003 NHL Entry Draft by the Vancouver Canucks.

Career statistics

Regular season and playoffs

International

Awards and honours

References

External links
 
 Jonathan Bernier biography at The Goaltender Home Page - advanced statistics and game logs

1988 births
Living people
Anaheim Ducks players
Canadian expatriate ice hockey players in Germany
Canadian ice hockey goaltenders
Colorado Avalanche players
Detroit Red Wings players
Heilbronner EC players
Ice hockey people from Quebec
Lewiston Maineiacs players
Los Angeles Kings draft picks
Los Angeles Kings players
Manchester Monarchs (AHL) players
National Hockey League first-round draft picks
New Jersey Devils players
Sportspeople from Laval, Quebec
Stanley Cup champions
Toronto Maple Leafs players
Toronto Marlies players